Sultan Yoosuf II Dri loka aanandha Mahaa Radhun was the Sultan of the Maldives from 1421 to 1443. He was the son of Sultan Hassan I.

References 

15th-century sultans of the Maldives